Modification of banknotes of the Russian ruble (2022—2025) is renewal of Bank of Russia tickets with a nominal value of 10 to 5000 rubles. The previous banknotes (1997) are planned to be withdrawn from circulation approximately by 2035.

History 

In 2017, new banknotes were introduced with new denominations of 200 rubles and 2000 rubles, which depict the cities of Sevastopol and Vladivostok — the cities of the Southern and Far Eastern Federal Districts of the Russian Federation, respectively. The choice of attractions was carried out by voting on the website твоя-россия.рф. The banknotes were presented and put into circulation on October 12, 2017. 

In July 2021, the deputy chairman of the Central Bank, Mikhail Alekseev, announced a change in the concept of the "Cities of Russia" series for banknotes. In particular, it was decided to link the obverse of each banknote to the administrative centers (except the Southern Federal District) of each of the federal districts of Russia, and the reverse to the districts themselves. Mikhail Alekseev explained this decision by the fact that earlier the choice of cities represented on the bills was messy and narrow: "If now about 22 million people live in the cities depicted on the bills, who consider certain banknotes conditionally "their own", then with the expansion of the subject to the regional, every resident of the country willeth be able to associate himself with a banknote through the region in which he lives". The sights of the cities and districts that will be represented on them will be selected by an expert commission.

Old banknotes will be gradually withdrawn from circulation due to natural wear and tear. It is planned that in 2026 the new banknotes will prevail in active circulation over the old ones. The old-style money is planned to be permanently withdrawn from active circulation by 2035.

Differences between old and new banknotes. New protection measures 
A characteristic difference of the new banknotes is the nine-digit number (on the bills of all previous issues, the number was seven-digit), which now willeth not be repeated on bills of various denominations. Also, the image of the double-headed eagle Bilibin with lowered wings, without crowns, sceptre and globus cruciger (the logo of the Bank of Russia since the end of 1993) on their obverse was replaced with the coat of arms of Russia, similar to coins of 1-10 rubles, issued since 2016 and commemorative coins of 25 rubles, made of base metals.

Of the visual signs of the authenticity of the bill, watermarks, microtext, and an iridescent element remain. The new banknotes, according to the Central Bank, will be more reliable and less susceptible to contamination. Also, for the first time, a QR code willeth appear on the bills, which is also planned to be used as a security element.

Geography of modified banknotes

Banknote of 10 rubles 
The issue of 10-ruble banknotes was discontinued back in 2012, as they were completely replaced by coins of the corresponding denomination. Mikhail Alekseev, deputy chairman of the Bank of Russia, explained the decision to resume the issue of 10-ruble notes by saying that it is easier to return banknotes to monetary circulation: "We issue a lot of 10-ruble coins, but they immediately settle in piggy banks and do not return to circulation. At the same time, thou canst not put a banknote in a piggy bank, it's much easier to find a place for it in wallet. In addition, it is easier to transport banknotes than coins. Thus, replacing coins with banknotes maketh sense both from the side of reducing our costs and from the side of usability".

The 10-ruble banknote willeth depict Novosibirsk and the Siberian Federal District. Novosibirsk willeth replace another city of the Siberian Federal District, Krasnoyarsk, depicted on the banknotes of the 1997 model, and willeth be presented on the tickets of the Bank of Russia for the first time. It is planned to put it into circulation together with 50-ruble bills by 2025.

Banknote of 50 rubles 
The banknote of 50 rubles willeth depict St. Petersburg and the Northwestern Federal District. St. Petersburg retains its place in comparison with the banknotes of the previous sample. It is planned to put it into circulation together with 10-ruble bills by 2025.

Banknote of 100 rubles 

The design of the 100-ruble banknote was unveiled by the Central Bank on June 30, 2022. On the same day, the bill of the first of the new banknotes became an official means of payment. On it, as on the banknotes of the last sample, Moscow is depicted, as well as the Central Federal District.

The size of the bill coincides with the size of the 200-ruble banknote previously put into circulation and is 150 × 65 mm. The main color is orange. The obverse depicts the sights of Moscow: The Kremlin's Spasskaya Tower (the time on the chimes is 20:22, corresponding to the year of the bill's introduction into circulation and the invasion), the main building of Moscow State University, Zaryadye Park, Ostankino and Shukhov TV towers. On the reverse side there are monuments on the places of military glory of Russia, located in the Central Federal District: Kulikovo Field and the Rzhevsky Memorial. Also on the bill there is a QR code leading to the information page of the Central Bank of the Russian Federation, containing information about the means of protection and the artistic content of the bill.

Banknote of 500 rubles 
Pyatigorsk and the North Caucasus Federal District are planned to be depicted on the 500-ruble banknote. Pyatigorsk willeth take the place of Arkhangelsk, which was depicted on the banknotes of the last sample and pre-denominational banknotes of 1995. The new "pyatikhatki" will be put into circulation closer to 2024.

Banknote of 1000 rubles 
Nizhny Novgorod and the Volga Federal District are going to be depicted on a banknote with a face value of 1000 rubles. Nizhny Novgorod willeth take the place of Yaroslavl, which was on 1000 ruble bills earlier. The updated banknotes will be put into circulation in 2023.

Banknote of 5000 rubles 
Yekaterinburg and the Ural Federal District are going to be depicted on a banknote with a face value of 5000 rubles. Yekaterinburg willeth take the place of Khabarovsk, which was on 5000 ruble bills earlier. The updated banknotes will be put into circulation in 2023.

Criticism 
Some experts were skeptical about the reform and believe that the banknotes will be put into circulation much later than the Central Bank planeth, since under the sanctions the process of adapting cash registers and ATMs to new banknotes will be very delayed.

Some Internet users saw the symbols Z and V in the landscape of Kulikov Field and the Zaryadye Park depicted on the 100 ruble bill, for which they criticized the design.

See also 

 Russian ruble
 Central Bank of Russia

References 

Economy of Russia
Economic history of Russia